This is a list of seasons completed by the Boston Celtics of the National Basketball Association. It documents the team’s season-by-season records, including postseason records, and also includes year-end awards won by the team's players and/or coaches.

With seventeen NBA Championships, the Celtics are tied with the Los Angeles Lakers for the most amongst all NBA franchises, while the 1959-to-1966 domination of the NBA Championship, with eight straight titles, is the longest consecutive championship winning streak of any major professional sport team to date. Following this, the Celtics had two major periods of success separated by quite poor seasons during rebuilding. Between 1971–72 and 1975–76 the Celtics, led by Dave Cowens and John Havlicek, won 294 of 410 regular season games and reached the conference finals in each of those five seasons, winning two more NBA championships, whilst between 1979–80 and 1987–88 led by the frontcourt of Larry Bird, Kevin McHale and Robert Parish the Celtics won 550 of 742 regular season games and reached every Conference Final except for 1982–83 when they were swept in the Conference Semifinals by the Milwaukee Bucks. The Celtics have had 13 separate seasons where they won 60 or more regular season contests, the highest number for any franchise.

With the acquisition of Kevin Garnett for 2007–08, the Celtics achieved a record single-season rise in win percentage to claim their first title in twenty-two seasons, in the process achieving the best average point differential between the 1995–96 Bulls and the 2015–16 Warriors. The team remained a power until after the 2011 lockout, but lost to the Warriors in their most recent Finals appearance.

The Celtics are 23–8 all-time in seventh games of playoff series, and 7–1 in Game 7 of the NBA Finals.

Seasons

All-time records

References

Events in Boston
 
seasons